Helene Johanne Caroline Schjørring (née Krohne; 4 June 1836 in Skive – 9 March 1910 in Frederiksberg) was a Danish author of Bildungsroman novels, a genre of coming of age novels, such as Esther's History (1884), Sirius (1900), Lange Skygger (1904) and Iris (1907). A member of the Danish Women's Society, she was one of the first ten women in Denmark to be awarded state support for her writing in 1883.

References 

1836 births
1910 deaths
Danish writers
Danish novelists